Johann Spies (ca. 1540-1623) was a German printer who published an anonymous book of tales about a legendary Doctor Faust who made a pact with the Devil. The story became the basis for several notable literary works, including Marlowe's Tragedy of Doctor Faustus and Goethe's Faust.  

Spies published the book in 1587 in Frankfurt am Main under the title Historia von D. Johann Fausten. The book is a compendium of anecdotes about a professor of theology and medicine who undertakes the study of sorcery, forms an alliance with the Devil (in the form of a friar named Mephistopheles), and undergoes a series of fantastic adventures. In the end, Faust is punished for his sins when Satan torments him and takes his soul to hell. 

Within a year the book was translated into English, and by 1611 it had also appeared in French, Dutch, and Czech.

German printers
Businesspeople from Frankfurt
Year of birth uncertain
1623 deaths
1540 births